Ladies and Gentlemen: Barenaked Ladies and The Persuasions is a collaborative album between Canadian rock band Barenaked Ladies and New York a cappella group The Persuasions. The album was released on April 14, 2017. The album consists of fourteen re-worked songs from Barenaked Ladies' back catalog, plus a cover of The Persuasions' song "Good Times".

Production

After playing two songs together in New York City on the Last Summer on Earth 2016 tour, both parties agreed that they would like to collaborate. This resulted in a two-day session from October 23 to 24, with Gavin Brown producing, at Noble Street Studios in Toronto. The album was made available for pre-order on March 10, 2017. Pre-orders of the album came with an instant download of "Don't Shuffle Me Back", "The Old Apartment", "Keepin' It Real" and "Odds Are".

Track listing

Personnel
Barenaked Ladies
Jim Creeggan – bass, background vocals, lead vocal on "Narrow Streets" and "Maybe Katie"
Kevin Hearn – piano, synthesizers, acoustic and electrics guitars, background vocals, lead vocal on "Don't Shuffle Me Back" and "Sound of Your Voice" 
Ed Robertson – lead vocals, acoustic and electric guitars, background vocals
Tyler Stewart – drums, background vocals

The Persuasions
Jimmy Hayes – bass vocals, lead vocal on "Don't Shuffle Me Back"
Jayotis Washington – baritone vocals
Dave Revels – lead vocal on "Some Fantastic" and "Good Times"
Clifford Dawson – 2nd tenor vocals, lead vocal on "The Old Apartment" and "Sound of Your Voice"
Raymond Sanders – 1st tenor vocals
Samuel White – baritone vocals

Production
Produced by Gavin Brown
Recorded and mixed by Lenny Derose
Assisted by Alex Krotz, Kevin O'Leary and Trevor Anderson
Pro Tools Sith-Lord: David Mohacsi
Digital editing by Ryan Theissen, Christian Fedele and Shaddy Roman
Mastered by Harry Hess at HBomb Mastering
Photography: Matt Barnes for thatsthespot.com
Art Direction: Chris Bilheimer
Management: Alison Taylor for ATwork Management
Legal: Len Glickman and Stephen Henderson (Cassels Brock, Toronto)
Business Management: Kenna Danyliw, Danyliw & Mann
Persuasions Management: David Backer, Backer Entertainment

Charts

References

2017 albums
Barenaked Ladies albums
The Persuasions albums
Collaborative albums
Albums produced by Gavin Brown (musician)
Albums recorded at Noble Street Studios